The following Union Army units and commanders fought in the Battle of Chickasaw Bayou of the American Civil War. The Confederate order of battle is listed separately.

Abbreviations used

Military rank
 MG = Major General
 BG = Brigadier General
 Col = Colonel
 Ltc = Lieutenant Colonel
 Maj = Major
 Cpt = Captain
 Lt = 1st Lieutenant

Other
 w = wounded
 k = killed

Expeditionary Force, Army of the Tennessee

Right Wing, XIII Corps
MG William T. Sherman

Unattached units
 Battery A, 1st Illinois Light Artillery: Cpt Peter P. Wood
 Battery B, 1st Illinois Light Artillery: Cpt Samuel E. Barrett
 Battery H, 1st Illinois Light Artillery: Lt Levi W. Hart
 Chicago Mercantile Light Artillery: Cpt Charles G. Cooley
 8th Ohio Light Artillery: Lt James F. Putnam
 17th Ohio Light Artillery: Cpt Ambrose A. Blount
 3rd Illinois Cavalry: Col Lafayette McCrillis
 Thielman's Battalion (Illinois):
 6th Missouri Cavalry: Col Clark Wright
 Patterson's Kentucky Engineers & Mechanics: Cpt William F. Patterson

See also

 Mississippi in the American Civil War

References
 Bearss, Edwin C. The Campaign for Vicksburg 3 vol. (Dayton, OH:  Morningside), 1985-1986.
 Johnson, Robert Underswood & Clarence Clough Buell (eds.).  Battles and Leaders of the Civil War Volume 3 (New York:  The Century Company), 1884.
 Winschel, Terrence C. Triumph & Defeat:  The Vicksburg Campaign (Mason City, IA:  Savas Pub. Co.), 1999.

American Civil War orders of battle